Tallow was a constituency represented in the Irish House of Commons until 1800, centred on Tallow, County Waterford.

Members of Parliament
1613–1615 Sir Gerard Lowther the elder and Sir Lawrence Parsons 
1634–1635 Thomas Ellwell and Sir William Fenton 
1639–1645 John Fitzwilliam Barry and John Ogle
1661–1666 Folliott Wingfield (sat for Wicklow. Replaced May 1661 by Archibald Stewart) and Boyle Smith (died and replaced 1662 by Henry Howard)

1692–1801

References

 

Constituencies of the Parliament of Ireland (pre-1801)
Historic constituencies in County Waterford
1800 disestablishments in Ireland
Constituencies disestablished in 1800